George Peasgood (born 2 October 1995) is a British paratriathlete who competes in the PTS5 classification. He represented Great Britain at the 2016 Paralympic Games in Rio, where he finished seventh. Peasgood has won the GBR Paratriathlon National Championships four times- 2015, 2016, 2017, 2019. George Peasgood is based in Loughborough, England where he trains at the Loughborough Performance Centre. He was born in Saffron Walden, Essex.

Career 
Peasgood first started triathlon in 2009 following a leg lengthening operation. In 2011, he was classified as a Paratriathlete at a British Triathlon Talent ID day. Peasgood won his first major medal in 2013 winning bronze at the ITU World Triathlon Grand Final London and silver at the GBR Paratriathlon National Championships. The classification structure was changed in 2014, making Peasgood's classification much more challenging but he still finished in the top ten in all five of the events he competed in. The 2015 season saw him win his first major event gold medal at the GBR Paratriathlon National Championships and win silver medals at the Buffalo City ITU World Paratriathlon Event, London ITU World Paratriathlon Event and Detroit ITU World Paratriathlon Event.

Peasgood made his Paralympic debut in triathlon as the youngest member of the paratriathlon team at the 2016 Summer Paralympics in Rio de Janeiro, finishing seventh in the men's PT4 event. He also won a gold medal that year in the 2016 Penrith ITU World Paratriathlon Event. The 2017 season saw Peasgood win a gold medal at the GBR Paratriathlon National Championships and two silver medals at the Iseo - Franciacorta ITU Paratriathlon World Cup and Edmonton ITU World Paratriathlon Series. He also won two bronze medals at the 2017 Yokohama ITU World Paratriathlon Series and Kitzbühel ETU Triathlon European Championships.

Peasgood consistently made the podium throughout 2018, taking gold at the Yokohama ITU World Paratriathlon Series, Iseo - Franciacorta ITU World Paratriathlon Series and Lausanne ITU Paratriathlon World Cup. He also won a silver medal at the 2018 Eton Dorney ITU Paratriathlon World Cup and a bronze medal at the ITU World Triathlon Grand Final Gold Coast. Peasgood also represented Great Britain in paracycling in 2018 and won a UCI Time Trial World Cup Silver. This success continued into 2019, as Peasgood was victorious in the PTS5 race at the Great Britain Paratriathlon National Championships. He also took home a silver medal at the Milan ITU World Paratriathlon Series and bronze at both the Groupe Copley World Paratriathlon Series Montreal and the Tokyo ITU Paratriathlon World Cup.

Personal life 
Peasgood suffered a traumatic injury to his left leg when he was two years old, which led to him undergoing several reconstructive surgeries during his childhood. Coming from a family of high-achieving triathletes, his brother Jack Peasgood is not only married to paratriathlete, Alison Peasgood, but has also represented the Great Britain Age Group team in both triathlon and duathlon. Additionally, Peasgood's mother has completed ten consecutive London Marathons and his father got into triathlon following a running injury. Both of his parents have completed Ironman triathlons.

Following a cycling accident during training on 1 October 2022, Peasgood suffered a diffuse axonal injury and remains in hospital.

Paratriathlon Competitions 
The following list of results. Unless indicated otherwise, the competitions are paratriathlons.

 DNF = Did not finish

 DNS = Did not start

 DSQ = Disqualified

References 

Living people
Paratriathletes of Great Britain
1995 births
British male triathletes
Paratriathletes at the 2016 Summer Paralympics
Paratriathletes at the 2020 Summer Paralympics
English male triathletes